Vaughen Isaacs (born 29 March 1999) is a South African rugby union player for the  in the Currie Cup and the  in the Rugby Challenge. His regular position is fly-half or fullback.

Isaacs made his Currie Cup debut for the Blue Bulls in August 2019, coming on as a replacement fly-half in their final match of the 2019 season against the.

Senior career

References

South African rugby union players
Living people
1999 births
Rugby union fly-halves
Rugby union fullbacks
Blue Bulls players
South Africa Under-20 international rugby union players
Golden Lions players
People from Cradock, Eastern Cape
Rugby union players from the Eastern Cape
Lions (United Rugby Championship) players